Kochubey is a rural locality (a selo) in Tarumovsky District, Republic of Dagestan, Russia. The population was 7,272 as of 2010. There are 35 streets.

Geography 
Kochubey is located 38 km north of Tarumovka (the district's administrative centre) by road. Talovka is the nearest rural locality.

References 

Rural localities in Tarumovsky District